The Secret Life of a Satanist: The Authorized Biography of Anton LaVey is a biography on the life of Anton LaVey, the founder of LaVeyan Satanism and the Church of Satan, released in 1990 through Feral House publishing. The book is written by Blanche Barton, administrator of the Church of Satan and partner and confidant of LaVey."

References

Bibliography 

 

American biographies
1990 non-fiction books
Satanism
Satanic texts
Feral House books